{{hatnote|This article is about the genus of plants known as catsears. For the common weedy catsear see Hypochaeris radicata}}Hypochaeris is a genus of plants in the family Asteraceae. Many species are known as cat's ear. These are annual and perennial herbs generally bearing flower heads with yellow ray florets. These plants may resemble or be confused with dandelions and so some are called false dandelions.

Estimates of the number of species range from about 50   up to about 100. Most species are native to South America, but some are found in Eurasia and North Africa.

 Etymology 
Its name is derived from Greek ὑπό (under) and χοῖρος'' (young pig). Thus the name should be spelled Hypochoeris.

Species 

 Species

References

Other sources

External links
 
 
 GBIF entry, with species list
 Jepson Manual Treatment
 GRIN Genus Profile

 
Asteraceae genera